The 1920–21 British Home Championship was a football tournament played between the British Home Nations during the 1920–21 season. The second tournament played since the hiatus of the First World War, the 1921 competition was dominated by Scotland, who won the first of seven championships they would claim throughout the decade. England and reigning champions Wales came joint second as goal difference was not at this stage used to separate teams.

England and Ireland kicked off the competition in October 1920, with England gaining an early advantage through a 2–0 victory. Action resumed the following February when Scotland beat current champions Wales at home and then Ireland away, to top the table. Wales and England both needed victory in their match to have a chance of catching Scotland, but both sides nullified each other and the result was a scoreless draw, requiring an English victory over the Scots in their final game to beat Scotland's lead. In the final games played simultaneously on 9 April, Wales beat Ireland to elevate themselves into joint second place as England crashed 3–0 to a superior Scottish side in Glasgow, thus making Scotland British Champions.

Table

Results

Winning squad

References

British
British Home Championships
Home Championships
Home Championships
Home Championships
Home Championships
Home Championships
Home Championships